A Camp is the solo side project of Nina Persson, vocalist for the Swedish indie pop band The Cardigans, her husband, composer Nathan Larson, and former Atomic Swing guitarist Niclas Frisk. Persson formed A Camp when The Cardigans took a break after several years of touring and the recording of their 1998 album Gran Turismo. A Camp recorded and released two albums, in 2001 and 2009, after which the project has been inactive.

Albums

A Camp

A Camp's debut album, also called A Camp, was originally recorded with Niclas Frisk of Atomic Swing, before Persson teamed up with Mark Linkous of Sparklehorse to re-record it. In doing so, he also contributed some new songs to the album. Persson had been a long-time fan of Sparklehorse and has referred to them as "the best I've ever heard". After a gig in Lund, Sweden, Persson gave Linkous a cassette of all the demo A Camp songs.  When they met again during the recording of his new album, Persson invited him to produce her project.  Linkous listened, liked the songs, and agreed.

The album met with critical acclaim, and reasonable commercial success, topping the charts in Persson's native Sweden. 

In 2004, "Charlie Charlie" (the "I Can Buy You" single B-side) was covered (with new lyrics in Polish) by the Polish singer Ania and released as a single from her debut album Samotność po zmierzchu. A French version of "Charlie Charlie" was recorded by Vanessa and the O's for inclusion on their debut album La Ballade d'O in 2004 which retained the same title. Vanessa & The O's featured Niclas Frisk, Andreas Mattsson, James Iha and French singer songwriter Vanessa Quinones.

The debut album released the singles "I Can Buy You" and "Song for the Leftovers". The country-inspired influence was also apparent in The Cardigans' following album, Long Gone Before Daylight, which was released in the UK in 2003 and the US in 2004.

Colonia

The recording of a second A Camp album was confirmed by Persson in an interview with Swedish newspaper Dagens Nyheter in May 2007. "Girl-pop from the 60s, 80's punk, and David Bowie" were said to be the main influences. The album, produced by Persson with husband and film composer Nathan Larson and Atomic Swing's Niclas Frisk, features appearances from ex-Smashing Pumpkins guitarist James Iha, Joan As Policewoman and Guided By Voices drummer Kevin March.

The first single from Colonia, "Stronger Than Jesus", was released on the Swedish iTunes on 17 November 2008. The full album was released in Europe in February 2009, via Universal, and in the US via Nettwerk.

Covers EP
A three-track EP named Covers, featuring interpretations of Pink Floyd's "Us And Them", David Bowie's "Boys Keep Swinging" and Grace Jones' "I've Done it Again", was released digitally in the United States on 9 June 2009 and in Europe on 16 June 2009.

Post 2009

Persson has continued to record and perform as a solo artist, and reunite with The Cardigans for occasional tours. There are not known to be any plans for further A Camp recordings.

Discography

Studio albums

EPs

Singles

References

External links 

imeem
Purevolume
Biography for Nina Persson at imdb
Live photos of Nina Persson and A Camp
A Camp discography

Swedish alternative rock groups
Swedish musical trios
2001 establishments in Sweden
Musical groups established in 2001
English-language singers from Sweden